Gahoe Museum is a private museum in Gahoe-dong, Jongno-gu, Seoul. Established in 2002, its collection includes over 1,500 items, including 750 amulets, 250 items of folk paintings, approximately 150 classical books, and 250 other odd items. The museum is located on a street of traditional Hanok houses and gardens. The main exhibition hall retains traditional Joseon era architectural features.

In addition to permanent and special exhibitions, the museum also operates the Gahoe Folk Painting Workshop where visitors can learn folk painting.

See also
Bukchon Art Museum
List of museums in Seoul
List of museums in South Korea

References

External links
 

Jongno District
Museums in Seoul
Museums established in 2002
2002 establishments in South Korea